Serua is a volcanic island located in the Banda Sea, Indonesia. Administratively it is part of the Maluku Tengah Regency, Maluku Province. The main village is Jerili.

Mount Serua is a Stratovolcano on Serua Island. Its last eruption was in 1921.

The Serua language is an Austronesian language originally spoken on Serua. The inhabitants were relocated to Seram owing to volcanic activity on Serua.

See also 
 List of volcanoes in Indonesia

References

External links
Serua Island, Serua volcano

Maluku Islands
Serua
Serua
Serua
Barat Daya Islands
Islands of the Maluku Islands
Holocene stratovolcanoes